

pl

pla-pli
Placidyl (Abbott Laboratories)
plafibride (INN)
Plan B (Paladin Labs)
Plaquenil (Sanofi-Aventis)
Plasma-Lyte
Platinol (Bristol-Myers Squibb)
plaunotol (INN)
plauracin (INN)
Plavix (Bristol-Myers Squibb)
pleconaril (INN)
Plegine
Plegisol
Plenaxis
Plendil (AstraZeneca)
plerixafor (USAN, (INN))
Pletal
pleuromulin (INN)
plicamycin (INN)
plinabulin (USAN, INN)
plitidepsin (INN)

plo-plu
plomestane (INN)
plovamer (USAN)
plusonermin pranosal (INN)

pm
PMB. Redirects to Polymyxin B.

po

pob-pod
pobilukast (INN)
podilfen (INN)

pol

pola-polo
polacrilin (INN)
polaprezinc (INN)
Polaramine
poldine metilsulfate (INN)
policresulen (INN)
polidexide sulfate (INN)
polidronium chloride (INN)
polifeprosan (INN)
poligeenan (INN)
poliglecaprone (INN)
poliglusam (INN)
polihexanide (INN)
polisaponin (INN)
polixetonium chloride (INN)
Polocaine
poloxalene (INN)
poloxamer (INN)

poly
Poly-Pred
Poly-Rx

polyb-polyn
polybenzarsol (INN)
polycarbophil (INN)
polyestradiol phosphate (INN)
polyetadene (INN)
polygeline (INN)
polyglycolic acid (INN)
Polymox
polymyxin B (INN)
polynoxylin (INN)

polys-polyt
polysorbate 1 (INN)
polysorbate 120 (INN)
polysorbate 20 (INN)
polysorbate 21 (INN)
polysorbate 40 (INN)
polysorbate 60 (INN)
polysorbate 61 (INN)
polysorbate 65 (INN)
polysorbate 8 (INN)
polysorbate 80 (INN)
polysorbate 81 (INN)
polysorbate 85 (INN)
polysorbate (INN)
Polysporin (Johnson & Johnson)
polythiazide (INN)
Polytrim (Allergan)

pom-poz
pomalidomide (USAN)
pomisartan (INN)
ponalrestat (INN)
ponezumab (USAN)
ponfibrate (INN)
Ponstel
porfimer sodium (INN)
porfiromycin (INN)
Portalac
Portia
posatirelin (INN)
poskine (INN)
potassium canrenoate (INN)
potassium glucaldrate (INN)
potassium nitrazepate (INN)
potassium sulfate (USAN)
Povan
povidone (INN)
pozanicline (USAN)

pr

pra

prac-pras
practolol (INN)
pradefovir (USAN, (INN))
prajmalium bitartrate (INN)
pralatrexate (USAN)
pralidoxime iodide (INN)
pralmorelin (INN)
pralnacasan (USAN)
pramiconazole (USAN)
Pramine
pramipexole (INN)
pramiracetam (INN)
pramiverine (INN)
pramlintide (INN)
pramocaine (INN)
Pramosone
prampine (INN)
pranazepide (INN)
Prandase (Bayer AG) [Ca]. Redirects to acarbose.
Prandin (Novo Nordisk)
pranidipine (INN)
pranlukast (INN)
pranolium chloride (INN)
pranoprofen (INN)
Prantal
prasterone (INN)
prasugrel (INN)

prav-praz
Pravachol
pravadoline (INN)
pravastatin (INN)
Pravigard Pac
praxadine (INN)
prazarelix (INN)
prazepam (INN)
prazepine (INN)
praziquantel (INN)
prazitone (INN)
prazocillin (INN)
prazosin (INN)